Monica's gecko (Pachydactylus monicae), also known commonly as Monica's thick-toed gecko, is a species of lizard in the family Gekkonidae. The species is endemic to southern Africa.

Etymology
The specific name, monicae, is in honor of Monica Frelow Bauer who is the wife of Aaron M. Bauer.

Habitat

Pachydactylus monicae is found in mesic microhabitats near rivers and adjacent rocky outcrops in arid habitats. P. monicae is generally found below elevations of 100 meters, but also can be found on the lower slopes of mountains.

Geographic range
P. monicae is found in the Lüdertiz and Karasburg districts of Namibia and the most northwestern part of the Northern Cape in South Africa.

Description

Reproduction
P. monicae is oviparous.

References

Further reading
Barts, Mirko (2011). "The Thick-toed geckos of Southern Africa. Part XII. Pachydactylus monicae Bauer, Lamb & Branch, 2006". Sauria Terraristik und Herpetologie, Berlin 33 (2): 9–14.
Bauer, Aaron M.; Lamb, Trip; Branch, William R. (2006). "A Revision of the Pachydactylus serval and P. weberi Groups (Reptilia: Gekkota: Gekkonidae) of Southern Africa, with the Description of Eight New Species". Proceedings of the California Academy of Sciences, Fourth Series 57 (23): 595–709. (Pachydactylus monicae, new species, pp. 664–667 + Figures 82–87 on pp. 634–637).

Pachydactylus
Geckos of Africa
Reptiles of Namibia
Reptiles of South Africa
Reptiles described in 2006
Taxa named by William Roy Branch